Dharmapuri is a village and the mandal headquarters of Dharmapuri mandal in Jagtial district of Telangana, India.

Geography

Dharmapuri is situated at a distance of about 28–30 km from Jagityal town railway station and 42 km from Mancherial town on the Kazipet–Balharshah section of the South Central Railway on the Bank of River Godavari. This river flows West to East except in Dharmapuri where it flows North to South hence the river is termed as Dakshina Vahini (South Flowing).

References 

Villages in Jagtial district
Mandal headquarters in Jagtial district